The Río Cahabón (Cahabón River) is a  river in eastern Guatemala. From its  sources in the Sierra de las Minas range in Baja Verapaz it turns north and then east into Alta Verapaz, running through Santa Cruz Verapaz, Tactic, Cobán, San Pedro Carchá, Semuc Champey and Santa María Cahabón below which it joins the smaller Polochic River.

It has whitewater reaches, with Class III and IV rapids — intermediate to challenging — which are favoured spots for touristic river rafting.

See also
Lake Chichoj

References

Rivers of Guatemala